Gigny may refer to the following communes in France:

 Gigny, Jura, in the Jura department
 Gigny, Yonne, in the Yonne department
 Gigny-Bussy, in the Marne department
 Gigny-sur-Saône, in the Saône-et-Loire department